Latirus amplustre is a species of sea snail, a marine gastropod mollusk in the family Fasciolariidae, the spindle snails, the tulip snails and their allies.

Description

Distribution

References

  Lyons W.G. & Snyder M.A. (2015). New species of Latirus (Montfort, 1810) and taxa with which they have been confused (Gastropoda: Fasciolariidae: Persterniinae). Novapex. 16(2): 33–48

External links
 Sowerby, G. B., I. (1825). A catalogue of the shells contained in the collection of the late Earl of Tankerville : arranged according to the Lamarckian conchological system: together with an appendix, containing descriptions of many new species London, vii + 92 + xxxiv pp
 Rosenberg G. & Petit R. E. 2003. Kaicher's Card Catalogue of World-Wide Shells: a collation, with discussion of the species named therein. The Nautilus 117(4): 99–120

Fasciolariidae
Gastropods described in 1817